Ronald Asamsum (born on April 14, 1989) is an Indonesian footballer that currently plays for Persigubin Gunung Bintang in the Indonesia Super League.

References

External links
Ronald Asamsum at Liga Indonesia

1989 births
Living people
Indonesian footballers
Liga 1 (Indonesia) players
Persiwa Wamena players
Association football midfielders